Haji Abdul Halim bin Abdul Rahman (10 November 1939 – 22 August 2022) was a Malaysian politician who served as the deputy Menteri Besar of Kelantan from 1990 to 2004, a member of the Kelantan State Legislative Assembly (MLA) for Banggol from August 1986 to April 1995 and for Kijang from April 1995 to March 2004 and a member of parliament (MP) for Pengkalan Chepa from March 2004 to May 2013. He was a member and Treasurer of the Malaysian Islamic Party (PAS), a component party of the ruling Perikatan Nasional (PN) and formerly Pakatan Rakyat (PR) opposition coalitions.

Election results

References 

1939 births
2022 deaths
People from Kelantan
Malaysian Islamic Party politicians
Malaysian people of Malay descent
Malaysian Muslims
Members of the Dewan Rakyat
Members of the Kelantan State Legislative Assembly
Deaths from the COVID-19 pandemic in Malaysia